Celaenorrhinus ankasa, commonly known as the Ankasa sprite, is a species of butterfly in the family Hesperiidae. It is found in Ghana. The habitat consists of forests.

References

Endemic fauna of Ghana
Butterflies described in 2005
ankasa